The fifth season of the animated television series Archer, known as Archer Vice,  aired in the United States on the cable network FX from January 13 to April 21, 2014.

Production
On February 27, 2013, FX renewed Archer for a fifth season. 

This season transitions to a new format, moving away from revolving around a spy agency (after it is revealed ISIS was never sanctioned by the U.S. government), to depicting the characters embarking on a life of crime as they attempt to sell cocaine.

Season 5 was officially dubbed Archer Vice in the opening credits sequence and was the first season to move away from an episodic format in favor of a serial storyline that played out over the course of all ten episodes. This trend would continue in future seasons with Adam Reed having said that he had grown tired of the show’s format being “mission of the week.”

Episodes

Home media

References

External links 
 
 

2014 American television seasons
Archer (2009 TV series) seasons